Taor (Macedonian: Таор) is a village in North Macedonia. Administratively, Taor is in Zelenikovo Municipality and it is located some 20 km south-east of Skopje. Taor is on the left bank of the Vardar River.

Etymology
The etymology of the village's name Taor derives possibly from the ancient name Tauresium, an ancient town and modern archaeological site near the village.

Demographics
According to the 2002 census, in Taor lived 152 people, all Macedonians.

References

See also 
 Tauresium
 Justinian I

Villages in Zelenikovo Municipality